Daniel Londoño may refer to:
 Daniel Londoño (footballer) (born 1995), Colombian footballer
 Daniel Londoño (economist), Colombian economist and academic